DNG can have the following meanings:

 Digital Negative, also known as "Adobe DNG" and "Adobe Digital Negative", a publicly available digital photography raw image format
 Delaware National Guard
 DetonatioN Gaming
 Negative-index metamaterial, also known as double negative metamaterials, materials in which both permittivity and magnetic permeability are less than zero. They are a class of Electromagnetic metamaterials.
 Degrassi: The Next Generation, a Canadian television series
 An abbreviation of dienogest, a progestin medication
 The ISO 639-3 code for the Dungan language
 The station code for Dandenong railway station, Victoria, Australia

See also
 Dolce & Gabbana
 Dany N'Guessan